Delta National Forest is a U.S. National Forest in western Mississippi, located in Sharkey County, and has an area of . Delta is operated as the Sunflower Wildlife Management Area. The forest is headquartered in Jackson, as are all six National Forests in Mississippi, but Delta Ranger District office is located in Rolling Fork. It is one of only six National Forests that are contained entirely within a single county and the only bottomland hardwood forest in the National Forest system.

The Green Ash-Overcup Oak-Sweetgum Research Natural Areas within the Delta National Forest are a rare example of pristine bottomland hardwood forests.  They were declared National Natural Landmarks in May 1976.

Sunflower Wildlife Management Area
Under a Memorandum of Understanding between the US forest Service and the Mississippi Department of Wildlife, Fisheries and Parks Delta National Forest is operated as the Sunflower Wildlife Management Area.

References

External links
National Forests in Mississippi

National Forests of Mississippi
National Natural Landmarks in Mississippi
Protected areas of Sharkey County, Mississippi
Wildlife management areas of Mississippi